Knowle West Boy is the seventh studio album by musician and producer Tricky, released by Domino Records on 7 July 2008 in Europe, and 9 September 2008 in North America.

A remixed version of the album called Tricky Meets South Rakkas Crew was released in 2009 and was mixed by Florida-based producers South Rakkas Crew.

Details
The first single, "Council Estate", samples "Roads" by Portishead from the 1994 album Dummy. It was the first single that Tricky had ever done with just himself on vocals. He commented: "I couldn't whisper that song. I had to come out of myself and do a loud, screaming vocal. I wanted to be a proper frontman on that one."

"Cross to Bear" features guest vocals from Hafdís Huld.

"Veronika" is a cover of the song "Livido Amniotico" by Subsonica (featuring Veronika Coassolo), which was first published as one of three previously unreleased studio tracks in their 2003 live album Controllo del livello di rombo.

Track listing

Charts

References

2008 albums
Tricky (musician) albums
Albums produced by Bernard Butler
Domino Recording Company albums